Cathepsin X (cathepsin B2, cysteine-type carboxypeptidase, cathepsin IV, cathepsin Z, acid carboxypeptidase, lysosomal carboxypeptidase B) is an enzyme. This enzyme catalyses the following chemical reaction

 Release of C-terminal amino acid residues with broad specificity, but lacks action on C-terminal proline. Shows weak endopeptidase activity

Cathepsin X is a cysteine cathepsin, a lysosomal cysteine peptidase of family C1 (papain family).

See also 
 Cathepsin Z

References

External links 
 

EC 3.4.18